The University of Technology and Business (Universidad Tecnología y Empresa) was a private university in Madrid, Spain with campuses in both Madrid and Toledo.

, the university offered forty-six bachelor's degrees and, through the Leadership School of Thought graduate program, twenty-three master's degrees and five doctorates.

History 
The university originated in ETEA, the Faculty of Economic and Business Sciences of Córdoba, a higher education centre founded in 1963. The establishment of the Universidad Tecnología y Empresa was approved by the Parliament of Spain on 23 November 2009. The first promotion enrolled in 2009.

References

Defunct universities and colleges in Spain